Heteroresistance is a phenotype in which a bacterial isolate contains sub-populations of cells with increased antibiotic resistance when compared with the susceptible main population. This phenomenon is known to be highly prevalent among several antibiotic classes and bacterial isolates and associated with treatment failure through the enrichment of low frequencies of resistant subpopulations in the presence of antibiotics. Heteroresistance is known to be highly unstable, meaning that the resistance sub-population can revert to susceptibility within a limited number of generations of growth in the absence of antibiotic. Regarding the instability and the transient characteristic of heteroresistance subpopulations, the detection of this subpopulation often face difficulties by the conventional minimum inhibitory concentration methods. Hence, there is a significant demand for clinical microbiology laboratories to use rapid standardized methods to identify heteroresistance in pathologic specimen to prescribe a proper antibiotic treatment for patients.

Mechanisms 
The enrichment of resistance sub-populations can be due to the acquisition of resistant mutations that are genetically stable but have high fitness cost or due to the enrichment of sub-population with increased copy number of resistance-conferring tandem gene amplifications.

References 

Bacteria